Rahboni Warren-Vosayaco (born 28 September 1995) is an Australian and rugby union player and professional who plays as a Flanker.

References

1995 births
Living people
Australian rugby union players
Australian expatriate sportspeople in Japan
Rugby union flankers
Urayasu D-Rocks players
Sunwolves players
Rugby union number eights
Rugby union centres
Greater Sydney Rams players
Munakata Sanix Blues players
New South Wales Waratahs players
Western Force players